Ahmed Bouanani (Casablanca, 16 November 1938 - Demnate, 6 February 2011) was a Moroccan film director, poet and novelist. He was best known from the 1979 film The Mirage, which featured as no.61 on the list of the best and most important 100 Arabic films commissioned by the 10th Dubai International Film Festival in 2013.

In 1983 he also made a comic strip for the newspaper Al Maghrib.

In addition to filmmaking, Bouanini wrote three collections of poetry and one novel, The Hospital, translated into English by Lara Vergnaud and published by New Directions in 2018.

Bibliography
 The Hospital (L'hôpital, novel) 
 The Shutters (Persiennes, poetry)

Filmography

Feature films 

 1979: The Mirage

Short films 
1968 : 6 et 12 
1971 : Mémoire 14 
1974 : Les Quatre Sources 
1996 ː La Marche d’un poète

References

Moroccan film directors
Moroccan comics artists
1938 births
2011 deaths